Nijgadh International Airport is a proposed hub-airport, located in Kolhabi, directly  to the south of Kathmandu, near the town of Nijgadh in  Madhesh Federal Province, Nepal. It is targeted to be completed by 2025 with an estimated investment of US$6.7 billion. If constructed, it would be the largest airport in South Asia and the fourth largest airport in the world in terms of land area. The airport is intended to relieve expected capacity restraints at Tribhuvan International Airport (TIA) in Kathmandu.

The Kathmandu–Terai Expressway is being constructed by Nepali Army to help connect the proposed airport and Kathmandu.

Supreme Court of Nepal halted the construction of project on 6 December 2019 due to an improper environmental impact assessment (EIA). On 26 March 2022, the court gave final verdict that quashed all the decisions of the government to build the Nijgadh airport.

Location 
The airport perimeter covers 80 km2 (8000 hectares) of land, mostly in Kolhabi Municipality, and partially in Gadhimai Municipality, Haraiya V.D.C., Kakadi V.D.C., Karaiya V.D.C. and Sapahi V.D.C. of Bara District, Province No. 2, Nepal. The site borders Mahendra Highway to the north, Bakaiya River to the east and Pasaha River to the west.

The project area lies on a densely forested area, about 90 per cent. The tropical and sub tropical vegetation is mostly covered by Sal tree (Shorea robusta). The area is also a part of an  green belt that extends from Uttarakhand, India to Rautahat District, Nepal. Mahabharat and Churiya range lie  and  respectively north of the area.

The proposed airport lies at close quarters to the navigational fixes: PARSA, OMUPA, BIRGA and GAURA, that currently provide entry waypoints to Nepal via air. Nijgadh would also be connected from the proposed air-route 'Himalaya-2', which begins from Sudurpashchim in the west of Nepal and exits from the east, continuing towards Kunming, China following the airspace of India and Myanmar.

Background
The discussions of constructing a new international airport in Terai initiated in 1992, following the crash of Thai Airways International Flight 311 and Pakistan International Airlines Flight 268, which claimed the lives of 113 and 167 people respectively. As both accidents happened to be controlled flight into terrain, it was apparent that the topography and weather of Kathmandu posed challenges for the pilots. Tribhuvan Airport has also been plagued by traffic jams and has poor security and ground facilities.

In 1995, a consulting firm, NEPICO/IRAD conducted a pre-feasibility study on 8 different areas of Nepal to recommend a best site for a new international airport. Based on the geographical location, topography, distance to the largest cities, road accessibility, forest density and an airspace; NEPICO/IRAD suggested Dumbarwana V.D.C. (present day: Gadhimai Municipality) for an ideal construction site.

In February 2008, the cabinet of Prime Minister Pushpa Kamal Dahal decided to construct the airport under 'Build Own Operate and Transfer' (BOOT) model. In March 2010, Nepal Ministry of Culture, Tourism and Civil Aviation signed a contract with a Korean company, Landmark Worldwide (LMW)  to conduct a detailed feasibility study of the airport. LMW conducted the study at a cost of US$3.55 million and submitted a plan to the government on 2 August 2011. The LMW's plan stalled as the company hasn't received the payment for its study as of July 2019.

In March 2015, Turkish Airlines Flight 726 skidded off a runway during a poor visibility approach to Kathmandu, and the airport was shut down for four days. A month later, an earthquake with a magnitude of 7.8 MW, followed by an aftershock of 7.3 MW hit central Nepal. The general manager of TIA, Birendra Prasad Shrestha said, "if we had an alternative international airport, it would have been easier in managing distribution of relief materials effectively". The subsequent events has allowed Nepal government to lobby for the airport.

In June 2015, the Government of Nepal authorized the Civil Aviation Authority of Nepal (CAAN) to commence land acquisition for construction of the airport. The following year, CAAN funded GEOCE Consultants (P) Ltd. from Nepal to prepare Environmental and Social Impact Assessment (ESIA). The ESIA of Nijgadh Airport was submitted in March 2018. The ESIA report estimated the cost of the entire project to be US$6.7 billion. In May 2018, the Ministry of Forests and Environment approved the Environmental Impact Assessment (EIA).

On 6 December 2019, the Supreme Court of Nepal halted the construction of airport after a group of lawyers filed a public interest litigation (PIL) citing the improper preparation of EIA.

Master Plan 
The Environmental and Social Impact Assessment outlines the construction of the project in two phases. A 3600x45 meter double runway facility with a 3600x23 meter parallel taxiway and 22 aircraft stands to accommodate 6.7 million passengers per year at an 81,000 sq. meter terminal building will be constructed at an estimated cost of US$1.172 billion in the first phase of the development. The ultimate plan is to build a 720,000 sq. meter international terminal handling 60 million passengers per year, 174 parking bays capable of accommodating Airbus A380, and two parallel 3600 meter runways.

Civil Aviation Authority of Nepal(CAAN) has selected a company to construct the master plan of Nijgadh  Airport. CAAN issued a letter of intent on Friday stating that the master plan of Nijgadh Airport and the construction of a parallel taxiway at Bhairahawa Airport have been finalized by the consultant. According to CAAN, CG Infrata-BDA has been given the responsibility of preparing the updated master plan of Nijgadh International Airport. A dozen companies were interested in the letter of intent requested by NEA for the purpose of formulating the master plan. Out of that, six companies were shortlisted.

CAAN had sought detailed proposals from six companies. In that process, proposals were received from three companies. CG Infra-BDA was selected as the lowest bidder among the detailed proposals submitted.

According to CAAN, the company has been entrusted with the task of constructing the master plan at a cost of Rs 298.9 million. Earlier, the Ministry of Tourism had instructed the CAAN to expedite the selection of a company to formulate a master plan to speed up the construction of Nijgadh International Airport. Meanwhile, CAAN on Friday selected a consultant for the design and supervision required to make the runway of Gautam Buddha International Airport in Bhairahawa a parallel taxiway.

Minhart Limited of Singapore has been entrusted to provide consulting services for a total of Rs. 244 million. In coordination with Nepali Company Card Consult and Nepal Consult, this company will provide consultancy services in the construction of a taxiway at Gautam Buddha Airport.

A parallel taxiway will be constructed at Gautam Buddha Airport, which is in the final stage of construction, by reconstructing the runway currently used for domestic flights. Ships will take off and land from the new runway.

Conflicts
The project has drawn several criticisms over years for several issues.

Impact on environment and biodiversity 
The project has faced disapproval nationally and internationally, particularly over the environmental concerns. The project area is a heavily forested area and the forest is known to be the last remaining native hardwood forest in the eastern Terai. Environmentalists predict that the destruction of such a large number of trees may lead to the severe flooding in Birgunj, Gadhimai, Gaur and Kalaiya area as a result of the forests not being able to absorb the rainwater. As a solution to the destruction of forests, Nepali government has been pointing out an idea of the compensatory plantation. During an interview with BBC World Service on his visit to the United Kingdom in June 2019, Prime Minister KP Sharma Oli said, "if we cut 2.5 million trees, we can plant 5 million of them by acquiring necessary lands". Similarly, Environmental Management Planning (EMP) by GEOCE, the company that prepared EIA has proposed a plan for afforestation at a ratio of 1:25. Meanwhile, the stakeholder committee argues that the cost of plantation (US$118 million) would be a lot more than allocated in the EIA (US$2.26 million).

The proposed airport area is a home to numerous species including 500 species of birds, 23 endangered flora and 22 endangered wildlife species. The area also lies proximity to Parsa National Park, which protects endangered wildlife including Bengal Tiger and Asiatic Elephant. Parsa particularly accounts for 18 of 235 (7.7%) of the tiger population in Nepal.

The proposed airport vicinity has a higher water table which increases the chances of arsenic deposition at the downstream overtime, as the airport-activity increases. The biogeochemical cycle is also very rapid in the area.

Socio-economical Impacts 
CAAN acquired 24 hectares land of Tangiya Basti for development of the airport. This left a total of 7,500 population living in 1,476 households landless and face displacement. It is said that the government had provided shelters to the flood victims from different places of Nepal in Tangiya in 1975.

Alternatives

Murtiya 

Sarnath Forest Development Project located in Murtiya of Sarlahi district; covers 2700 hectares of newly planted Eucalyptus. After completing her visit to the Sarnath field in October 2018, Chanda Rana, an environment activist said, "We need only 1300 hectares of land for International Airport and 600 hectares for other infrastructure. This is more than enough for Airport construction at Sarnath, Murtiya site. Why do we need 8000 hectares of jungle"? Rana along with ten other activist filed a public interest petition in September 2019 to stop the construction of airport at Nijgadh.

The petitioners who filed a separate PIL, which led the SCON to halt Nijgadh's construction, also suggested to construct the new airport in Murtiya.

Upgrading TIA 
The protesters of the project have argued that the best alternative of Nijgadh airport would be upgrading the existing international airport in Kathmandu. This includes increasing length of a solely operational runway 02/20, increasing length of Taxiway 'G' to meet thresholds of the runway, extending operational hours, alleviating immigration procedures, increasing parking bays, etc.

The total aircraft movement in TIA in 2019 was 124,255. Although TIA has a capacity to accommodate 17 aircraft on its domestic parking bay, up to 35 aircraft are being accommodated. The airport observes frequent flight delays due to congestion. CAAN has also allowed other airlines to set up bases out of Kathmandu.

Some domestic airline pilots also have asked to shift international operations after morning.

See also
 Pokhara International Airport
 Gautam Buddha International Airport
 Tribhuvan International Airport

References

Airports in Nepal
National Pride Projects
Buildings and structures in Bara District
Proposed airports